Patrick Paul Billingsley (May 3, 1925 – April 22, 2011) was an American mathematician and stage and screen actor, noted for his books in advanced probability theory and statistics. He was born and raised in Sioux Falls, South Dakota, and graduated from the United States Naval Academy in 1946.

Academic career
After earning a Ph.D. in mathematics at Princeton University in 1955, he was attached to the NSA until his discharge from the Navy in 1957.  In 1958 he became a professor of mathematics and statistics at the University of Chicago, where he served as chair of the Department of Statistics from 1980 to 1983, and retired in 1994.  In 1964–65 he was a Fulbright Fellow and visiting professor at the University of Copenhagen.  In 1971–72 he was a Guggenheim Fellow and visiting professor at the University of Cambridge (Peterhouse). From 1976 to 1979 he edited the Annals of Probability.  In 1983 he was president of the Institute of Mathematical Statistics.  He was given the Lester R. Ford Award for his article "Prime Numbers and Brownian Motion." He was elected a Fellow of the American Academy of Arts and Sciences in 1986.

He starred in a number of plays at Court Theatre and Body Politic Theatre in Chicago and appeared in at least nine films.

In Young Men and Fire, fellow University of Chicago professor Norman Maclean wrote about Billingsley that "he is a distinguished statistician and one of the best amateur actors I have ever seen".

Books
 Statistical Inference for Markov Processes (1961)
 Ergodic Theory and Information (1965)
 Convergence of Probability Measures (1st Edition 1968, 2nd Edition 1999)
 The Elements of Statistical Inference (with David L. Huntsberger, 1986)
 Probability and Measure (1st Edition 1976, 2nd Edition 1986, 3rd Edition, 1995, Anniversary Edition 2012 )

Stage plays
 Three Magic Keys, Taliesin (1964)
 The Pirates of Penzance, Pirate (1966)
 Read Me a Story (1966)
 Clue of the Circus Clowns, Circus Master (1968)
 Finian's Rainbow, Buzz Collins (1968)
 Beadle-Levi Show (parody of The Homecoming) (1968)
 Guys and Dolls, Arvide Abernathy (1969)
 We Bombed in New Haven (Court Theatre, 1970)
 Victorian Children (1970)
 Vaudeville Show, singer (1970)
 The Threepenny Opera, street singer (1970)
 Four Plays of Fantasy and the Unusual (1970)
 Moulin Rouge (1971)
 Oh, What a Lovely War! (1973)
 Midsummer Night's Dream,  Theseus (Court Theatre, 1973)
 The Caretaker,  Aston (Court Theatre, 1973)
 The Father, The Captain (1974)
 Murder in the Cathedral, First Knight (1974)
 Twelfth Night, Feste (Court Theatre, 1974)
 The Same Room, Tom Ferris (1975)
 Dracula, Dr. Seward (1975)
 Much Ado about Nothing, Balthazar and Friar Frances (Court Theatre, 1975)
 Exits and Entrances (1976)
 Trifles, Sheriff Peters (1976)
 The Lover, Richard-Max (Court Theatre, 1977)
 The Tempest, Alonzo (Court Theatre, 1977)
 She Stoops to Conquer, Mr. Hardcastle (Court Theatre, 1978)
 Measure for Measure, The Duke (Court Theatre, 1979)
 Mrs. Warren's Profession, Rev. Samuel Gardiner (Court Theatre, 1980)
 Equus, Dr. Dysart (Court Theatre, 1980)
 The Seagull, Sorin (Court Theatre, 1981)
 Twelfth Night, Anotnio (Body Politic Theatre, 1981)
 Under Milk Wood, Rev. Eli Jenkins et al. (Court Theatre, 1982)
 The First Night of Pygmalion, Beerbohm-Tree et al. (Court Theatre, 1982)
 Midsummer Night's Dream, Peter Quince (Court Theatre, 1983)
 Much Ado about Nothing, Leonato (Court Theatre, 1984)
 Heartbreak House, Mazzini Dunn (Court Theatre, 1985)
 Every Good Boy Deserves Favor, KGB colonel (Court Theatre, 1985)
 The Birthday Party, Petey (1978 and 1985)
 Arms and the Man, Major Petkoff (Court Theatre, 1985)
 Moonlight Daring Us to Go Insane, J. Earl Sheets (Body Politic Theatre, 1987)
 Coastal Disturbances, R. Hamilton Adams (Body Politic Theatre, 1987)

Films
 The Fury (1978) - CIA agent Lander
 My Bodyguard (1980) - Biology Teacher
 Somewhere in Time (1980) - Professor
 One More Saturday Night (1985) - Mr. McGrath
 The Untouchables (1987) - Bailiff #2

Television
 Dummy (1978, TV Movie) - Dr. Morris
 Flesh and Blood (1978) - Boxing official
 The Children Nobody Wanted (1981) - Preacher
 The Dollmaker (1983) - Cooper
 The Last Leaf – A Parable of Easter (1983, Short) - Dr. Winchester
 The Private Eye (1983) - Guard
 Murder Ordained (1986) - Ray Call
 Jack and Mike (episode) (1986) - Judge
 Sable (1987) - Sullivan
 The Father Clements Story (1987, TV Movie) - Father Donovan (final film role)

Death
He died in 2011, aged 85, in his Hyde Park, Chicago home. He was survived by his children, Franny, Patty, Julie, Marty and Paul, and his companion, Florence Weisblatt. His wife of nearly 50 years, social activist Ruth Billingsley, died in 2000.

References

External links

 
 Obituary in the Chicago Tribune
 Patrick Billingsley, probability theorist and actor, 1925–2011

1925 births
2011 deaths
Male actors from South Dakota
American male stage actors
American male film actors
20th-century American male actors
20th-century American mathematicians
21st-century American mathematicians
Fellows of the American Academy of Arts and Sciences
Writers from Sioux Falls, South Dakota
Presidents of the Institute of Mathematical Statistics
Princeton University alumni
Probability theorists
University of Chicago faculty
American textbook writers
United States Naval Academy alumni
Annals of Probability editors
Mathematical statisticians